FC Instrumentalshchik Bishkek is a Kyrgyzstani football club based in Bishkek, Kyrgyzstan that played in the top division in Kyrgyzstan, the Kyrgyzstan League.

History 
1958: Founded as FC Instrumentalshchik Frunze.
1992: Renamed FC Instrumentalshchik Bishkek.
1994: Merged with Selmashevets Bishkek to FC Rotor Bishkek.

Achievements 
Kyrgyzstan League:
8th: 1992
11th: 1993

Kyrgyzstan Cup:

External links 
Career stats by KLISF

Football clubs in Kyrgyzstan
Football clubs in Bishkek
1994 disestablishments in Kyrgyzstan